Élégie is a neoclassical ballet by George Balanchine, to Élégie-Elegy for solo viola by Igor Stravinsky. Balanchine had made three versions of the ballet, premiered in 1948, 1966 and 1982 respectively.

The first version, a pas de deux, premiered on April 28, 1948 at the City Center of Music and Drama, during a  Ballet Society performance, with dancers Tanaquil Le Clercq and Pat McBride, and violist Emanuel Vardi. Stravinsky described this version as a preview of a pas de deux from the ballet Orpheus. 

The second version is a solo which premiered on July 15, 1966 at the Philharmonic Hall, performed by dancer Suzanne Farrell and violist Jesse Levine, in a program about Stravinsky directed by Lukas Foss. The New York City Ballet premiered it later that month with the same cast.

The last version, again with Farrell, premiered on June 13, 1982 at the New York State Theater, as part of NYCB's Stravinsky Centennial Celebration, with Warren Laffredo playing the viola on stage. Balanchine died the following year. It was not revived until 2012 at the Vail Dance Festival, danced by Pacific Northwest Ballet's Carla Körbes. Artistic director of the festival Damian Woetzel learned the choreography via tapes of Farrell, then taught it to Körbes. In 2020, due to the coronavirus pandemic, the festival streamed video of the 2012 performance online.

References

External links 
Élégie on the website of the Balanchine Trust

Ballets by George Balanchine
Ballets to the music of Igor Stravinsky
1982 ballet premieres
New York City Ballet repertory
New York City Ballet Stravinsky Centennial Celebration